Cole Shade Sule (born November 5, 1980) is a Cameroonian former swimmer, who specialized in sprint freestyle events. Sule qualified for the men's 50 m freestyle at the 2004 Summer Olympics in Athens, by receiving a Universality place from FINA, in an entry time of 25.96. He challenged seven other swimmers in heat three, including 16-year-old Chris Hackel of Mauritius. He raced to second place by less than 0.17 of a second behind winner Hackel in 26.16. Sule failed to advance into the semifinals, as he placed sixty-fourth out of 86 swimmers in the preliminaries.

References

1980 births
Living people
Cameroonian male freestyle swimmers
Olympic swimmers of Cameroon
Swimmers at the 2004 Summer Olympics
Sportspeople from Yaoundé